The tubeshoulders are a family, Platytroctidae, of ray-finned fish belonging to the order Alepocephaliformes. They are found throughout the world, except for the Mediterranean Sea.

Genera 
The family contains the following genera:
 Barbantus
 Holtbyrnia
 Matsuichthys
 Maulisia
 Mentodus
 Mirorictus
 Normichthys
 Pectinantus
 Persparsia
 Platytroctes
 Sagamichthys
 Searsia
 Searsioides
 Vachalia

References 

 
Ray-finned fish families